Sigel Township may refer to the following places:

 Sigel Township, Shelby County, Illinois
 Sigel Township, Huron County, Michigan
 Sigel Township, Brown County, Minnesota

See also

Sigel (disambiguation)

Township name disambiguation pages